"One Way Love" is the first single from freestyle group TKA's debut album Scars of Love. The song appeared in the 1986 film Modern Girls.

Track listing
US 12"/CD Single

Charts

References

1986 debut singles
TKA songs
1986 songs
Tommy Boy Records singles

External links